Baldred was king of Kent, from 823 until 826 or 827. Ceolwulf I, king of Mercia, had ruled Kent directly, and was deposed by Beornwulf in 823, and at about the same time moneyers at Canterbury started issuing coins in the name of Baldred, king of Kent. It is uncertain whether he was independent or a Mercian under-king. In 826 or 827 he was expelled by Æthelwulf, son of King Egbert of Wessex, and Kent was ruled directly by Wessex thereafter.

Nineteen of his coins are known.

Notes

References
 .

External links
 

Kentish monarchs
9th-century English monarchs
Year of birth unknown
Year of death unknown